Brittany May "Britt" McHenry (born May 28, 1986) is  television personality.   
She is the host of a show on WTTG Fox 5 in Washington, D.C.
McHenry was formerly an ESPN correspondent and a commentator on Fox Nation.

Personal
McHenry, the daughter of an Air Force Lt. Colonel, was born in Mount Holly Township, New Jersey, and grew up in Satellite Beach, Florida, where she graduated from Satellite High School  in 2004. A four-year varsity starter for the women's soccer team, she was teammates with future United States women's national soccer team player, goalkeeper Ashlyn Harris. McHenry attended Stetson University and played on the Hatters soccer team as a midfielder for the 2004 season. She also spent time as a model in college, working for the Wilhelmina Models agency. After graduating magna cum laude in 2007 from Stetson, McHenry went on to Northwestern University's Medill School of Journalism. At Medill, she started covering stories in Chicago, Illinois.

On February 27, 2020, McHenry revealed via Twitter, that on February 25, she was diagnosed with a brain tumor and that "surgery is imminent". She had brain surgery on March 4, 2020.

Career
After graduating from Medill School of Journalism, McHenry began her career working for WJLA-TV, ABC Television's Washington affiliate, and its sister station NewsChannel 8 as a sports reporter and fill-in anchor. After two weeks at Fox Sports San Diego as a dugout reporter on the San Diego Padres telecasts, she returned to ABC 7.

In March 2014, she left ABC7 to join ESPN as a Washington, D.C.-based bureau reporter. She served as correspondent for various shows including SportsCenter, Outside the Lines, NFL Live and Baseball Tonight. On April 27, 2017, McHenry announced on Twitter that she was being let go by ESPN, with the NFL Draft being her last assignment. McHenry was part of a 100-person layoff that included Ed Werder, Jayson Stark and Jay Crawford. In May 2018, McHenry tweeted that she was fired because she "was white and paid too much."

Sexual harassment allegation
In 2019, McHenry accused FOX co-host and wrestler Tyrus of sexual harassment after he allegedly sent her a series of lewd text messages. According to Fox News, the matter was investigated and resolved. However, on December 10, 2019, McHenry filed a sexual harassment suit against Fox News and Murdoch. Subsequently, McHenry claimed that she lost the phone containing text messages she says are central to her claims. In July 2021, she voluntarily dismissed the lawsuit and left the Fox network, apparently as part of a legal settlement.

Towing controversy
On April 16, 2015, a video of McHenry verbally berating and mocking a tow lot employee, Gina Michelle, using foul language was posted on LiveLeak. McHenry later apologized on Twitter:  In response to the incident, ESPN suspended McHenry from the network for one week. A day later, the towing company released a statement saying they did not want to see McHenry suspended or terminated as a result of her comments.

References

External links

 

1986 births
Living people
American reporters and correspondents
American sports journalists
ESPN people
Medill School of Journalism alumni
American women journalists
People from Mount Holly, New Jersey
Stetson Hatters women's soccer players
Women's association football midfielders
People from Satellite Beach, Florida
Women sports announcers
Stetson University alumni
American women's soccer players
21st-century American journalists
Journalists from New Jersey
Journalists from Florida
Satellite High School alumni
21st-century American women